Edvige Carboni (2 May 1880 – 17 February 1952) was an Italian Roman Catholic from Sardinia who relocated to Rome and became well-known among the faithful and religious alike for her ecstasies and angelic visions. She recorded an extensive spiritual journal in which she recorded appearances from Jesus Christ as well as saints such as Gemma Galgani and John Bosco. Carboni also experienced demonic experiences and was said to possess the stigmata.

The cause for beatification commenced in 1968 though she was accorded the title of Servant of God on 29 April 1994. Pope Francis titled her as Venerable on 4 May 2017 upon the confirmation of her life of heroic virtue. Francis later confirmed a miracle attributed to her intercession in late 2018 and she was beatified in her native Sardinia on 15 June 2019.

Life
Edvige Carboni was born in Sassari on the evening of 2 May 1880 as the second of six children to Giovanni Battista Carboni (d. 1937) and Maria Domenica Pinna (d. 1910); her sister was Paulina (b. 1895) and she also had four brothers (including Galdino (15 April 1889 – 7 March 1977)) and at least one other sister. Carboni received her baptism on the following 4 May 1880 from the vice-parish priest Sanna. She received her Confirmation in 1884 from Mgr. Eliseo Giordano and made a vow to remain chaste in 1885. She started school in 1886 and finished three grades of education.

Her mother recalled Carboni's birth and told her that on that occasion she had seen a luminous host in the monstrance and would tell her daughter this because: "If I die, you must receive Holy Communion every day and you should be very good, because Jesus, a few moments after you were born, showed me a host, as I have told you". Another odd phenomenon that took place after her birth was a supernatural branding of the Cross on her breast formed from her own flesh.

Her mother taught her embroidery as a child and she would work with her father in the embroidery business. She also spent time in the convent of the Sisters of Saint Vincent in Alghero where the nuns led a course in embroidery. Her mother's frail health saw her tend to the education and care of her younger siblings as well as other domestic duties.

Carboni made her First Communion in 1891. She wanted to become a nun in 1895 but her mother disapproved of it and she took this disapproval as a sign of the will of God. In 1895 her sister Paulina was born; at that point she had brothers and no sister. From 1896 her visions of Jesus and Mary became ever more frequent. She became a professed member of the Third Order of Saint Francis in 1906 and belonged to an association known as the Friends of Saint Thérèse of the Child Jesus; she began recording her thoughts in a spiritual journal. Her mother died in 1910 and her responsibilities tripled.

In her grandmother's home remained a replica of Raphael's painting of the Blessed Virgin Mary with the Infant Jesus: she would climb a chair to reach the image and would say to the Blessed Mother: "My mother, I love you. Give me your child so that I can play with Him". Carboni was required to do the shopping due to her mother's ill health despite being fearful of having to shop in the evening. But her guardian angel appeared to her and told her: "Don't be afraid. I am with you and I keep you good company".

She attended her brother Galdino's marriage to Penelope Gerundini (8 May 1899 – 31 December 1979).

Her spiritual gifts included levitation and the reading of hearts as well as the discernment of spirits and frequent visits from the souls in Purgatory. She also had several visions of Aloysius Gonzaga and on their first encounter he asked her: "Do you know me?" to which she replied that she did not. Gonzaga said: "I am Saint Aloysius Gonzaga. I have come to tell you that I love you very much and that you should love Jesus always".

Carboni stated in her diary that once during prayer, she was visited by Benito Mussolini, former Italian dictator, who said to her: "purgatory is terrible for me because I waited until the last moment to repent." According to her, God later informed Carboni that Mussolini's soul entered Heaven.

Carboni noted in her spiritual journal on 16 November 1938 how she received the stigmata – for she wanted to suffer for the glory of God – while she recorded in her journal on 12 June 1941 her first encounter with John Bosco. Bosco even invited her to enroll as a Salesian in an appearance on 25 September 1941. Carboni also received the transverberation and recorded a case of demonic encounter in December 1941. Her experiences with the Devil became more aggressive as time progressed. On one occasion she was kicked in the legs and on another her gold fillings were stolen. She once was confined to her bed for a while after a hammer hit her in the knees.

Carboni experienced a number of visions from saints:
 St. Dominic Savio
 St. Anne
 St. Sebastian
 St. Genaro
 St. Rita of Cascia – during a pilgrimage to the saint's shrine
 St. Thérèse of Lisieux
 St. Gemma Galgani – whom she admired; Carboni also attended her canonization in 1940
 St. Paul
 St. Catherine of Siena – on a 9 April 1950 pilgrimage to her shrine
 St. Francis of Assisi
Carboni also had visits from Saint Padre Pio of Pietrelcina in her visions despite the fact that the priest was in fact alive. Padre Pio knew of Carboni and referred to her as a "saint". She also knew Saint Luigi Orione.

She began to experience bilocation in 1925 and this grew greater during World War II. In 1929 her sister Paulina found a job as a teacher in Marcellina Scalo – a small town between Rome and Tivoli. Her father did not want Paulina to leave so the entire family relocated from Sardinia to the mainland. In 1934 she moved to Albano Laziale until the death of her father in 1937 and she finally settled in Rome in 1938. From 1941 she became part of the Confraternity of the Passion of Scala Santa in Rome. On 11 August 1941 she wrote of Jesus allowing her a view of Heaven.

Carboni spent the last fourteen years of her life living with her sister Paulina in Rome. Her final spiritual director was the Passionist priest Ignacio Parmeggiani. Her time in Rome saw her teach catechism while tending to the poor and the ill. She received praise for her piety from the Servant of God Giovanni Battista Manzella and priests such as Ernesto Maria Piovella and Felice Cappello.

On 17 February 1952 she got up in the morning to attend Mass and came home for a meal before going back to church to hear Father Lombardi preach a sermon. She and her sister arrived home via train at 8:30pm when she complained that she did not feel well. Her sister summoned a doctor and two priests from their parish who gave her the Last Rites. Carboni died of angina pectoris at 10:30pm and was buried in Albano Laziale. Her grave was with that of her brother Galdino and his wife.

Her remains from a white coffin were exhumed in October 2015 for canonical inspection as part of the canonization cause. Her remains were relocated as a result of this.

Beatification
The beatification process opened in the Diocese of Rome in a diocesan process that opened in December 1968 and concluded sometime later after having taken all of the available documents and interrogatories – this also included her spiritual journal.

On 29 April 1994 she became a Servant of God – under Pope John Paul II – with the formal commencement of the cause following the Congregation for the Causes of Saints granting the "nihil obstat" ('nothing against') to the cause.

The second process opened on 18 October 1999 and concluded on 1 June 2001 after which the C.C.S. validated the process on 1 March 2002. The postulation submitted the Positio in 2008 while theologians could not come up with conclusive approval the cause on 10 October 2013 after debating the extent of her mysticism and the depth of her spiritual writings with some aspects still requiring greater investigation; the theologians met again and provided their definitive approval to the cause on 29 November 2016. The C.C.S. approved her cause on 2 May 2017; Pope Francis confirmed her heroic virtue on 4 May 2017 and named her as Venerable.

The miracle required for her beatification was investigated in the place of its origin and received C.C.S. validation on 6 October 2000. Medical examiners inspected and approved the documents pertaining to this alleged miracle on 23 November 2017. Theologians later confirmed the miracle on 26 April 2018 and the C.C.S. members meet and approved this healing on 6 November 2018. Pope Francis approved this miracle in a decree on 7 November 2018 which allows for Carboni's beatification; it was held in her native Sardinia on 15 June 2019.

The current postulator assigned to the cause is Dr. Andrea Ambrosi.

References

External links

Hagiography Circle
Edvige Carboni

1880 births
1952 deaths
19th-century Christian mystics
19th-century venerated Christians
19th-century Italian people
20th-century Christian mystics
20th-century venerated Christians
20th-century Italian people
Angelic visionaries
Beatifications by Pope Francis
Italian beatified people
Italian Christian mystics
Marian visionaries
People from Sassari
Roman Catholic mystics
Stigmatics
Members of the Third Order of Saint Francis
Venerated Catholics by Pope Francis